The Tongues of Men is a 1916 silent film drama produced by the Oliver Morosco Company  and distributed by Paramount Pictures. Frank Lloyd directed and English stage actress Constance Collier stars in her debut film. The story is based on a 1913 Broadway play, The Tongues of Men, by Edward Childs Carpenter and starring Henrietta Crosman.

Status
The Library of Congress Silent Film Survival database shows no holdings for the film, however their 1978 printed Catalog of Holdings lists the film as being preserved in the collection in an incomplete print.

Cast
Constance Collier - Jane Bartlett
Forrest Stanley - Rev. Sturgis
Herbert Standing - Rev. Dr. Darigal
Betty Burbridge - Georgine (*Elizabeth Burbridge)
Helen Jerome Eddy - Winifred Leeds
Lamar Johnstone - Dr. Lyn Fanshawe (*as Lamar Johnson)
Lydia Yeamans Titus - Mrs. Kearsley
Helen Marlborough - Mme. Sternberg-Reese (*as Miss Marlborough)
Charles Marriott - Mr. Goadby
John McKinnon - Mr. Loughram

References

External links
The Tongues of Men at IMDb.com
The Tongues of Men ; allmovie/ synopsis

1916 films
American silent feature films
American films based on plays
Films directed by Frank Lloyd
1916 drama films
Silent American drama films
American black-and-white films
1910s American films